Soft soap may refer to:
 Soap that is liquid or easily soluble, usually made by saponification with potassium instead of the more typical sodium hydroxide
 Softsoap, trade name of a liquid soap product